Sammie Thomas McLeod (born 6th December 1999) is an English professional footballer who plays as a midfielder for Worthing.

McLeod joined Leicester City in 2017 from Maidstone United. After appearing in the U18 Premier League, he joined Maldon & Tiptree in 2018. In summer 2019, after impressing at Maldon & Tiptree, he joined Colchester United. He made his professional debut for Colchester in September 2020.

Career
Born in Royal Tunbridge Wells, McLeod started his career with Maidstone United, where he featured twice on the first-team bench but failed to make an appearance. He joined Leicester City in January 2017 where he featured for their Academy under-18 side. He made 14 U18 Premier League and FA Youth Cup appearances for the under-18s.

For the 2018–19 season, McLeod signed for Isthmian League North Division side Maldon & Tiptree, where he scored eight goals in 28 appearances between August and February, before a leg injury ended his season in March.

On 8 June 2019, League Two club Colchester United announced the signing of McLeod on a two-year deal.

McLeod made his professional debut on 19 September 2020, coming off the bench to replace Luke Gambin in Colchester's 2–0 win against Bolton Wanderers. He made his first start for the club ten days later in their 1–0 defeat to West Ham United under-21s in the EFL Trophy.

Colchester announced that McLeod was one of seven under-23 players who had their contract terminated by mutual consent on 1 February 2021.

After his release, he featured for National League South side Concord Rangers.

In May 2021, McLeod joined NIFL Premiership side Portadown. McLeod scored the Irish Premiership Goal of the Month for November, for his volley against Dungannon Swifts. On 18 January 2022, McLeod left Portadown by mutual consent.

In February 2022, McLeod returned to England and played four matches for Isthmian League side Lewes.

In March 2022, McLeod signed for 1. deild karla side Þór Akureyri.

Career statistics

References

2000 births
Living people
People from Royal Tunbridge Wells
English footballers
Association football midfielders
Maidstone United F.C. players
Leicester City F.C. players
Maldon & Tiptree F.C. players
Colchester United F.C. players
Concord Rangers F.C. players
Portadown F.C. players
Lewes F.C. players
Þór Akureyri players
Isthmian League players
English Football League players
NIFL Premiership players
National League (English football) players
1. deild karla players
English expatriate footballers
Expatriate footballers in Iceland
English expatriate sportspeople in Iceland
Worthing F.C. players